Sladaja is a village in Despotovac municipality, in the Pomoravlje District of Serbia. 

Populated places in Pomoravlje District